"Miracle of Love" is a song written by Bob Merrill and performed by Eileen Rodgers. It reached #18 on the U.S. pop chart in 1956.

Other charting versions
Ginny Gibson released a version of the song as a single in 1956 which reached #68 on the U.S. pop chart.

References

1956 songs
1956 singles
Songs written by Bob Merrill
Columbia Records singles
ABC Records singles